"You're the One" is a song by Yoko Ono, originally released in 1984 on Ono's and John Lennon's duet album Milk and Honey. The song was also on the compilation albums Onobox and Walking on Thin Ice.

Composition
The song's lyrics compare John Lennon and Yoko's Ono's relationship to be viewed by society as Laurel and Hardy, but viewed by the couple as Heathcliff and Catherine Earnshaw from Wuthering Heights.

Critical reception
Robert Christgau, in his review of Milk and Honey, stated that "You're the One" and its "cricket synthesizers," along with Ono's song "Sleepless Night", "are confident personal elaborations of a tradition she comes to secondhand."

Track listing
CD single
"You're the One" (Claude Le Gache Vocal Mix) – 7:33
"You're the One" (Morel's Pink Noise Vocal Mix) – 7:33
"You're the One" (Fricia & Lamboy Tribal Dub) – 9:28

Digital download (Vocal Mixes)
 "You're the One" (Bimbo Jones Vocal Mix) – 7:06
 "You're the One" (Bimbo Jones Dub) – 7:04
 "You're the One" (Morel’s Pink Noise Vocal Mix) – 7:33
 "You're the One" (Morel’s Pink Noise Dub) – 8:22
 "You're the One" (Claude Le Gache Vocal Mix) – 7:32
 "You're the One" (Claude Le Gache Mixshow Edit) – 6:08
 "You're the One" (Claude Le Gache Dub) – 7:33
 "You're the One" (Friscia & Lamboy Tribal Dub) – 9:28

Charts

Weekly charts

Year-end charts

Personnel
 John Lennon – guitar, keyboards, vocals
 Yoko Ono – vocals
 Peter Cannarozzi – synthesizer

References 

Yoko Ono songs
1984 songs
2007 singles
Song recordings produced by John Lennon
Song recordings produced by Yoko Ono
Songs written by Yoko Ono
Electropop songs